First United Methodist Church is a historic church located at the junction of North Pine Street and West Port Street in DeRidder, Louisiana. The two story Classical Revival tan brick building was built in 1915 and is now part of a church complex occupying an entire city block. The facade portico with Ionic columns and the glass windows have unchanged since the time of construction, and the church exterior is very well preserved. A new church was built in the 1960s on the southern portion of the block and the historic church interior was deeply altered in order to host a basketball court.

The church was added to the National Register of Historic Places in 1991.

References

See also
National Register of Historic Places listings in Beauregard Parish, Louisiana

United Methodist churches in Louisiana
Churches on the National Register of Historic Places in Louisiana
Neoclassical architecture in Louisiana
Churches completed in 1915
Buildings and structures in Beauregard Parish, Louisiana
National Register of Historic Places in Beauregard Parish, Louisiana
1915 establishments in Louisiana
Neoclassical church buildings in the United States